Olivier Marteel (born 10 May 1969) is a Belgian professional snooker referee who officiates on the World Snooker Tour.

Career
Born in Nieuwpoort, he now lives in Gijverinkhove. He first qualified as a referee in 1994 and began refereeing on the main professional tour in 2006. He took charge of his first World Snooker Championship final in 2015, becoming the first Belgian to referee a world final, and the second referee from continental Europe to do so, after Jan Verhaas. Marteel refereed his second world final in 2022. 

A frontline healthcare worker, he worked as a nurse in Belgium during the COVID-19 pandemic, despite being trained as a radiologist. In addition to the World Championships, Marteel has officiated the Masters final twice, in 2016 and 2018, and the UK Championship final twice, in 2016 and 2020. He also plays snooker and has achieved highest breaks of 133 in practice and 78 in competition.

References

External links
 Marteel's profile at WST.tv

Living people
Belgian referees and umpires
Snooker referees and officials
Pool referees and officials
Sportspeople from Ghent
1969 births
People from Nieuwpoort, Belgium